"Just Breathe" is a song by the American rock band Pearl Jam. "Just Breathe" was released on October 31, 2009 as the second single from the band's ninth studio album, Backspacer (2009). The song was triggered by a chord from "Tuolumne", an instrumental from Eddie Vedder's soundtrack for the 2007 film Into the Wild. 

It peaked at number six on the Billboard Alternative chart, which makes it the band's highest-charting follow-up single since "Wishlist" in 1998. While it only reached No. 78 on the Billboard Hot 100, it was a number-one hit in Poland, a top ten hit in Portugal and a top 20 hit in the Netherlands.

On January 22, 2014, "Just Breathe" was certified platinum in digital sales by the RIAA. It is the band's first platinum-certified song.

The song has been featured in several TV shows and movies, including Kodachrome,  Castle, One Tree Hill, Brothers & Sisters, Life as We Know It, The Blacklist, The Night Shift and iZombie in addition to the documentaries Buck and Gleason.

Track listing 
All lyrics written by Eddie Vedder.
CD (UK), 7" vinyl single, and digital download (UK)
"Got Some" (music: Jeff Ament) – 3:01
"Just Breathe" (music: Vedder) – 3:34

Digital download (Australia)
"Got Some" – 3:03
"Just Breathe" – 3:36
"Just Breathe" (Live at Austin City Limits video) – 3:52

Charts

Weekly charts

Year-end charts

Certifications

Covers
Willie Nelson released his version of the song on the 2012 album Heroes, as well as a promotional single.

Jennifer Warnes released her version of the song on the 2018 album Another Time, Another Place. 

Miley Cyrus released a version of the song on YouTube in 2020.

References

External links 
Lyrics at pearljam.com

2009 singles
Pearl Jam songs
Folk rock songs
Songs written by Eddie Vedder
Song recordings produced by Brendan O'Brien (record producer)
Songs about death
Rock ballads
Monkeywrench Records singles
2009 songs
Songs written by Jeff Ament